Manuel Ramón Pimentel Siles (born 30 August 1961) is a Spanish politician and writer. He served as Minister of Labour and Social of Spain from January 1999 to February 2000. In March 2003, Pimentel abandoned the People's Party (PP) in protest over the Irak War crisis, forming his own party, the Andalusian Forum.

References

1961 births
Living people
University of Córdoba (Spain) alumni
Government ministers of Spain
21st-century Spanish politicians
Labour ministers of Spain